The A. J. Dean House is a historic house in Kalispell, Montana, U.S.. It was built circa 1895, and designed in the Tudor Revival architecture. It has been listed on the National Register of Historic Places since August 11, 1980.

References

Houses on the National Register of Historic Places in Montana
Tudor Revival architecture in Montana
Houses completed in 1895
National Register of Historic Places in Flathead County, Montana
1895 establishments in Montana
Kalispell, Montana
Houses in Flathead County, Montana